The Lo Beele House is a historic house at 312 New York Avenue in Brinkley, Arkansas.  It is a -story American Foursquare house, with a hip roof, pierced at the front by a pair of round-topped dormers.   A single-story porch extends across most of the front, with a low balustrade with turned balusters and square posts.  A smaller porch stands on the side, with similar styling.  The house was designed by Arkansas architect Charles L. Thompson, and was built about 1910.

The house was listed on the National Register of Historic Places in 1982.

See also
National Register of Historic Places listings in Monroe County, Arkansas

References

Houses on the National Register of Historic Places in Arkansas
Colonial Revival architecture in Arkansas
Houses completed in 1910
Houses in Monroe County, Arkansas
National Register of Historic Places in Monroe County, Arkansas